The 1920 Dublin Corporation election took place on Thursday 15 January 1920 as part of that year's Irish local elections. 80 councillors to Dublin Corporation were elected from 10 borough electoral areas on the system of proportional representation by means of the single transferable vote (PR-STV) for a five-year term of office.

Sinn Féin won a slight majority in the council, with 42 seats. Whilst the Sinn Féin majority was small, they emerged from the election as by far the largest party on the Dublin Corporation council.

Following the election Thomas Kelly, the Sinn Féin MP for Dublin St Stephen's Green, was unanimously elected by the council as the new Lord Mayor of Dublin. Kelly was elected despite being held at the time as a political prisoner in Wormwood Scrubs prison in England. Kelly was nominated for the position by the outgoing Lord Mayor Laurence O'Neill. Due to Kelly's imprisonment O'Neill continued as effective Lord Mayor.

Boundaries
These were the first elections under the Local Government (Ireland) Act 1919, which introduced a form of proportional representation. Under the old ward system, each of 20 wards had elected one alderman and three additional councillors. In 1919, the Local Government Board of Ireland created 10 borough electoral areas (BEAs), taking a greater account of population in the city, which took effect at these elections. Two councillors from each BEA were designated as aldermen.

Results by party

Results by electoral area
* designates incumbent councillor.

No. 1 Electoral Area
Arran Quay Ward.

No. 2 Electoral Area
Clontarf East Ward, Clontarf West Ward, Drumcondra Ward and Glasnevin Ward

The count was particularly long, with no candidates meeting the quota from counts 2 to 14.

No. 3 Electoral Area
Fitzwilliam Ward, Mansion House Ward, Royal Exchange Ward and South City Ward.

No. 4 Electoral Area
Inns Quay Ward and Rotunda Ward.

No. 5 Electoral Area
Merchant's Quay Ward.

No. 6 Electoral Area
Mountjoy Ward.

No. 7 Electoral Area
New Kilmainham Ward and Usher's Quay Ward.

No. 8 Electoral Area
North City Ward and North Dock Ward.

No. 9 Electoral Area
Wood Quay Ward.

No. 10 Electoral Area
Trinity Ward and South Dock Ward.

Notes

References

1920 Irish local elections
1920